Arthur Ravensdale (5 January 1911 – 15 November 1975) was a Canadian hurdler. He competed in the men's 110 metres hurdles at the 1932 Summer Olympics. He was also the Canadian national champion in sprinting in 1931. An attendee of Marquette University, he set a world record for 120-yard low hurdles in 1932 at 13.2 seconds.

References

1911 births
1975 deaths
Athletes (track and field) at the 1932 Summer Olympics
Canadian male hurdlers
Marquette University alumni
Olympic track and field athletes of Canada
Athletes (track and field) at the 1930 British Empire Games
Athletes (track and field) at the 1934 British Empire Games
Commonwealth Games competitors for Canada
Place of birth missing